Vendsyssel Forenede Fodboldklubber is a professional football club based in Hjørring, Denmark. The team competes in the Danish 1st Division, the second tier of Danish football. The club plays home matches at Nord Energi Arena, which has a capacity of 7,500. The club is playing on a license from Hjørring IF, which used to belong to FC Hjørring. The club is a cooperation between Hjørring IF and Frederikshavn fI.

History
The roots of Vendsyssel FF can be traced to 9 November 1886, where Hjørring Gymnastikforening was founded. After multiple mergers, the club was named Hjørring IF in 1921. The club's existence has been marked by relative anonymity, bouncing between the lower divisions of the Danish football pyramid. Renamed FC Hjørring in 2006, the club, however, soon found success, secured promotion in their 2009–10 Danish 2nd Divisions campaign. This meant their first promotion to the Danish 1st Division, the second tier in the Danish football league system. 

In May 2013, the Danish Football Association announced that FC Hjørring's licence would be revoked due to poor economy, resulting in a relegation to the Danish 2nd Divisions. FC Hjørring appealed the decision, which was successful, as the Danish Football Association assessed that the financial situation had improved sufficiently in order to renew the licence for the 2010-11 Danish 1st Division. 

On 24 June 2013, FC Hjørring announced a merger with Frederikshavn fI, which would subsequently change the name of the club to Vendsyssel FF. On 3 March 2014, Frederikshavn fI officially announced that they would step out of the merger on the senior level, but that they intended to continue a partnership with Vendsyssel FF on the youth level.

In the summer of 2018 the club earned its first promotion to the highest tier in Danish football by beating Lyngby BK in two games in the Superliga playoffs, after losing in the playoffs the year before to AC Horsens. They only lasted one season in the Superliga, however, as they were relegated the following season.

Stadium
Vendsyssel FF's Nord Energi Arena, more popularly known as Hjørring Stadion, was opened in 1930 and went through renovations in 2014. Besides being the home ground for Vendsyssel FF, it also functions as home ground for nine-time Danish women's football league winners, Fortuna Hjørring.

Players

Current squad
As of 31 January 2023

Youth players in use 2022-23

Former players

  Mark Ryutin

References

External links

 Official club website

Football clubs in Denmark
Hjørring
Association football clubs established in 2013
2013 establishments in Denmark